Borrman is a surname. Notable people with the surname include:

Pip Borrman (1954–2009), Australian aerobatics pilot
Sven Borrman (1933–2004), Swedish weightlifter

See also
Borman
Borrmann